The 1992 Asian Junior Women's Volleyball Championship was held in Kuala Lumpur, Malaysia from 22 –  August to 29 August 1992

Pools composition
The teams are seeded based on their final ranking at the 1990 Asian Junior Women's Volleyball Championship.

Preliminary round

Pool A

|}

|}

Pool B

|}

|}

Pool C

|}

|}

Pool D

|}

|}

Classification round
 The results and the points of the matches between the same teams that were already played during the preliminary round shall be taken into account for the classification round.

Pool E

|}

|}

Pool F

|}

|}

Classification 9th–12th

Semifinals

|}

11th place

|}

9th place

|}

Final round

Classification 5th–8th

Championship

5th–8th semifinals

|}

Semifinals

|}

7th place

|}

5th place

|}

3rd place

|}

Final

|}

Final standing

References
Results (Archived 2014-10-17)

A
V
V
Asian women's volleyball championships
Asian Junior